Andrée Danis was a French film editor. She worked on around thirty films between 1919 and 1952 including Abel Gance's J'accuse.

Selected filmography
 J'accuse (1919)
 The Duke of Reichstadt (1931)
 The Eaglet (1931)
 A Man of Gold (1934)
 They Were Twelve Women (1940)
 Paris-New York (1940)
 Strange Suzy (1941)
 Frederica (1942)
 Rendezvous in Paris (1947)
 My Seal and Them (1951)
 My Friend Oscar (1951)
 Jocelyn (1952)

References

Bibliography 
 Pym, John. Time Out Film Guide. Penguin Books, 2002.

External links 
 

Year of birth unknown
Year of death unknown
French film editors
French women film editors